Howdy is an informal greeting, originally a shortened form of the greeting How do ye? It originated in the South England dialect in circa 1563-1587.

Origin 
Literature from that period (1563/87) includes the use of How-do, how-do and How as a greeting used by the Scottish when addressing Anglo settlers in greeting. The double form of the idiom is still found in parts of the American Southwest as Howdy, howdy. Without regard to etymological beginnings, the word is used as a greeting such as "Hello" and not, normally, as an inquiry.

Use in different states 

In the rural Southern United States, Howdy is a colloquial contraction of the formal greeting of How do you do?, and as such is considered a formal and acceptable greeting in the South, as well as Western states such as Arizona, California, Colorado, Idaho, Montana, Nevada, New Mexico, Oregon, Texas, and Wyoming.

References

External links 

 McLemore, David. "Saving an Endangered Species: Native Texan Buddy Calk wants "Howdy" to come back, y'all." The Dallas Morning News. January 22, 1989.

16th-century neologisms
fiction